"No Worries" is a song by American hip hop recording artist Lil Wayne, released on September 3, 2012, as the lead single from his tenth studio album, I Am Not a Human Being II. It features vocals from Detail and was produced by Detail himself, along with the production team The Order.

Background 
The song was originally set to be Wayne's next single from his upcoming album. After many push backs on the release of his twelfth mixtape, he decided to include the song on Dedication 4 (2012), and was officially released September 3, 2012, as the first single from his then-upcoming tenth studio album I Am Not a Human Being II (2013). Complex named the song #50 on their list of best songs of 2012.

Music video
The music video premiered on MTV on November 21, 2012, and then on BET's 106 & Park on November 26, 2012, and was directed by Colin Tilley. The video pays homage to the film Fear and Loathing in Las Vegas. It features a cameo appearance from rapper Birdman.

Charts

Weekly charts

Year-end charts

Certifications

References

2012 singles
2012 songs
Lil Wayne songs
Cash Money Records singles
Songs written by Lil Wayne
Songs written by Detail (record producer)
Song recordings produced by Detail (record producer)
Music videos directed by Colin Tilley
Songs written by Dre Moon
Songs written by Birdman (rapper)